The 2010 Red Bull Air Race World Championship was the eighth official Red Bull Air Race World Championship series. Paul Bonhomme became champion for the second successive year, finishing each of the six rounds of the championship in the top three placings, two of which were victories. Hannes Arch was the only other round winner, taking four victories but finished four points behind Bonhomme, after an eleventh-place finish in the season-opener in the United Arab Emirates. Nigel Lamb finished third with three runner-up placings, and three fourth places.

At the end of the season, Red Bull Air Race GmbH announced that the series would take a one-year break in 2011, to reorganize and strengthen development and commercial aspects of the series.

Aircraft and pilots

New pilots 
Two new pilots joined the Red Bull Air Race Series for 2010 season as Mike Mangold and Glen Dell left the series. They were Martin Šonka from the Czech Republic and Adilson Kindlemann from Brazil.

Race calendar and results

Championship standings 

(*) indicates the pilot received an extra point for the fastest time in Qualifying

Incidents 
At about 11:50AM local time, (3:50 UTC) on 15 April, Brazilian pilot Adilson Kindlemann crashed his MXS-R aircraft into the Swan River in Perth, Western Australia during practice. Rescuers were on the scene within one minute. Kindlemann was taken to Royal Perth Hospital where it was found that he had no serious injuries. It was only the previous day (14 April) that the pilots completed their underwater emergency training. Kindlemann was the first South American to contest the Air Race and was three-times Brazilian aerobatics champion (Unlimited category) when he joined the competition with 18 years aerobatics experience; over 11,000 hours flight time; and about 1,200 hours of aerobatics, as detailed on the official Red Bull Air Race website.

During qualifying for the race in Windsor, Matt Hall nearly crashed his aircraft into the Detroit River. The aircraft lost lift after a series of high-G turns and dipped both wings and a wheel into the water before Hall powered up and out of what could have been a bad wreck. His aircraft was too damaged to continue and he was disqualified from competing both that weekend and the following race in New York.

Spanish pilot Alejandro Maclean was killed on 17 August, when his aircraft crashed into the ground while performing a manoeuvre during a training exercise at Casarrubios del Monte in Spain.

References

External links 
 Red Bull Air Race official website
 Unofficial Air Race website
 Smoke-On.com A Red Bull Air Race Fan Site
 Bleacher Report's Red Bull Air Race Page

Red Bull Air Race World Championship seasons
Red Bull Air Race
Red Bull Air Race